Swartzia fistuloides is a species of legume in the family Fabaceae.
It is found in Angola, Cameroon, Republic of the Congo, Democratic Republic of the Congo, Ivory Coast, Equatorial Guinea, Gabon, Ghana, and Nigeria.
It is threatened by habitat loss.

References

fistuloides
Endangered plants
Taxonomy articles created by Polbot
Taxobox binomials not recognized by IUCN